Tanja Spill (born 16 December 1995) is a German athlete. She competed in the women's 800 metres event at the 2021 European Athletics Indoor Championships.

References

External links

1995 births
Living people
German female middle-distance runners
Place of birth missing (living people)
21st-century German women